Coning is a phenomenon which affects helicopter rotor discs. The tips of the helicopter rotor blades move faster through the air than the parts of the blades near the hub, so they generate more lift, which pushes the tips of the blades upwards, resulting in a slight cone shape to the rotor disc. This is balanced by centrifugal force. If rotor RPM drops too low, the rotor blades fold up with no chance of recovery.

Helicopter rotors are typically designed with washout (twist) so that lift is relatively uniform along the blades. However, because lift increases quadratically with airspeed, coning still occurs at higher RPMs.

Some helicopters such as the Bell UH-1 Iroquois are designed with "pre-coned" blades, which are curved downwards but lay more flat in flight.

The ratio of aerodynamic forces to inertial forces is called the Lock number.

See also
Unequal rotor lift distribution

References

Helicopter aerodynamics